Grymes is a surname. Notable people with the surname include:

Aaron Grymes (born 1991), Canadian footballer
Charles Grymes McCawley (1827–1891), American military service member
John Randolph Grymes (1786–1854), American politician
William Grymes Pettus (1794–1867), American politician